John Billings may refer to:
 John Billings (Australian physician) (1918–2007), family planning pioneer
 John Shaw Billings (1838–1913), American librarian, building designer, and surgeon
 John Shaw Billings (editor) (1891–1975), his grandson, first editor of Life magazine